A constitutional referendum was held in Guatemala on 16 May 1999. It featured four questions; one on defining the nation and social rights (including those of the indigenous population, workers, military service and an expansion of the social security system) one on reforming Congress, one on reforming the executive (including redefining the role of the military) and one on reforming the judiciary. All four were rejected by voters, although turnout was just 18.6%.

Results

Definition of the nation and social rights

Reform of Congress

Reform of the Executive

Reform of the Judiciary

References

1999 referendums
Constitutional,1999
Constitutional referendum
1999 elections in Central America
Guatemala,1999
May 1999 events in North America